Kurt Anthony Vialet (born May 26, 1964) is an Virgin Islander politician and former educator who served as a senator in the Legislature of the Virgin Islands from the St. Croix District from 2015 to 2023. He ran as an independent candidate for Governor of the U.S. Virgin Islands in the 2022 election.

Early life and education
Kurt Vialet was born on May 26, 1964, in St. Croix to Roy Vialet of St. Thomas and Helena Matta-Vialet of Fajardo, Puerto Rico. A product of the Virgin Islands public school system, he graduated from the St. Croix Central High School in 1982. Vialet attained his Bachelor of Arts in Mathematics from the University of the Virgin Islands and a Master of Arts in Administration and Supervision in 1992.

Career
Immediately after graduation from the University of the Virgin Islands, Vialet began working at the Virgin Islands Department of Education. He has occupied the position of a Teacher and an Assistant Principal at the Elena L. Christian Junior High School, a Principal at the St. Croix Educational Complex High School and Principal of the Arthur A. Richards Junior High School. In August 1995, Vialet was given the duty of designing and structuring SCEC and became the first principal to open the island’s second high school.

Elections

2014
A newcomer entering politics for the first time, Vialet topped number one with 3,184 votes in the August 2 Democratic primary. He maintained first place with 8,288 votes in the general election on November 4, 2014.

2016
Vialet secured first place in the Democratic primary with 1,544 votes. He went on to win re-election with 5,818 votes in the general election.

2018
Vialet came in fourth place behind of Senator Novelle Francis Jr., who tied 1,842 votes with him.

2020
Vialet retained his number one spot while receiving 4,421 votes.

Committee assignments
31th Legislature
 Committee on Education and Workforce Development (Vice Chair)
 Committee on Finance (Vice Chair)
 Committee on Energy and Environmental Protection
 Committee on Economic Development, Agriculture and Planning
 Committee on Health, Hospitals and Human Services (Chair)

32nd Legislature
 Committee on Finance (Chair)
 Committee on Committee on Health, Hospitals and Human Services (Vice Chair)
 Committee on Education, Youth and Recreation 
 Committee on Economic Development and Agriculture

34th Legislature 
 Committee on Finance (Chair)

References

1964 births
Democratic Party (United States) politicians
Independent politicians
Living people
Senators of the Legislature of the United States Virgin Islands